This is a list of events in South African sport in 2005.

Athletics
 7 March - Mbulaeni Mulaudzi wins gold in the 800 metres at the 10th IAAF World Indoor Championships in Athletics held in Budapest
 28 August - Mbulaeni Mulaudzi wins silver in the 800 metres at the 28th Olympic Games held in Athens

Football (Rugby Union)

June
 12 June - The South Africa (Springboks)  beat Ireland 31-17 at Vodacom Park, Bloemfontein
 19 June - The Springboks beat Ireland 26-17 at Newlands, Cape Town
 26 June - The Springboks beat Wales (The Dragons)  53-18 in Pretoria

July
 17 July - The Springboks beat the Pacific Islanders 38-24
 24 July - The Springboks lose to New Zealand (All Blacks)  23-21 at Jade Stadium, Christchurch in the Tri Nations Series
 31 July - The Springboks lose to Australia (Wallabies)  30-26 at the Subiaco Oval, Perth, Western Australia in the Tri-Nations Series

August
 14 August - The Springboks beat the All Blacks 40-26 at the Ellis Park Stadium, Johannesburg in the Tri-Nations Series
 21 August - The Springboks beat the Wallibies 23-19 in the Tri-Nations Series

November
 6 November - The Springboks beat The Dragons 38-36 at the Millennium Stadium, Cardiff
 13 November - The Springboks lose to Ireland 12-17 at Lansdowne Road, Dublin 
 20 November - The Springboks lose to England 16-32 at the Twickenham Stadium, London
 27 November - The Springboks beat Scotland 45-10 at the Murrayfield Stadium, Edinburgh

December
 4 December - The Springboks beat Argentina (los Pumas)  39-7 at José Amalfitani Stadium, Buenos Aires

Football (Soccer)
 17 November - South Africa (Bafana Bafana) beats Nigeria 2-1 in the Nelson Mandela Challenge held in Ellis Park Stadium, Johannesburg

See also
2003 in South African sport
2004 in South Africa
2005 in South African sport
List of years in South African sport

 
South Africa